Greenhills, formerly and still commonly known as the Greenhills Shopping Center, is a  mixed-use shopping, residential and leisure development located in Greenhills, San Juan, Metro Manila, the Philippines.

Established by Ortigas and Company as the centerpiece shopping center of the Greenhills development in the 1970s, it is a mall complex containing more than 2,000 stores and is one of the oldest shopping malls in the country.

History

Conception
In 1966, the plans for building the Greenhills Shopping Center began which followed a two-year study of community development projects in various parts around the world. The concept was presented by Filipino architect Juan Nakpil.

1970s to 1980s
The Greenhills Shopping Center opened in the early 1970s and was among the first shopping centers to be established in the Philippines. The shopping complex housed shopping malls, the Virra Mall and Shoppesville, the Manilabank, PCIB (now BDO), Padilla, and Crossroads arcades, Greenhills Theater, Greenhills Bowling Alley, and a supermarket by the name of Unimart. All of these facilities were leased out to other companies except the theater. These companies in turn leased out space to small retailers.

In the 1980s, Greenhills was a place to hang out during the weekends, especially for the youth who often frequented the Virra Mall, to shop, watch movies, dine, visit the video arcades and to go to hobby stores at Shoppesville. Music Hall and Annapolis Live is also frequented. Later tiangges or small stalls began to sprout in Greenhills. They started out in annual bazaars during the Christmas season and eventually increased in numbers and their operations became all-year-round.

Redevelopment

Most of the lease were expired by 2002, and most of the companies which the facilities were leased to did not make any significant improvements or renovations since their lease contracts were about to expire. Greenhills lost tenants and visitors as other shopping centers opened in other parts of Metro Manila. Ortigas & Company, initially planned to sell the complex but decided against it and started to redevelop the complex themselves. A new management team was set up in late 2001 to facilitate the complex's redevelopment.

Among the first redevelopments was the renovation of the Greenhills Theater into the Greenhills Theatre Mall. The Greenhills Theatre Mall was reopened to the public on January 27, 2002. Previously the facility which houses two theaters, had fallen to near-disuse, occasionally opening only for special event of corporations and Christian fellowships.

The Virra Mall was also renovated from January to December 2005. The former Virra Mall, built in 1975 and sculptural design done by architect José María Zaragoza, was demolished in January 2005.

The first phase was completed in 2013, with the introduction of more parking and retail space, cinemas and The Viridian, a 53-storey residential condominium, with turnover to residents made in April 2016. The new relocated Unimart, occupying the first two levels (including Anson's) of the new Greenhills Carpark Building built next to the one-storey Unimart site, opened on July 2, 2017. The latter is now the site of the expansion of Greenhills' Main Mall.

The Annapolis carpark has been demolished to give way for the construction of The Connor, its 2nd residential tower in the complex. V-Mall's foodcourt has been closed and is now converted into a new zone with restaurants.

Expansion of main mall

A new 7-level ( GFA) integrated regional mall with a hybrid lifestyle and budget retail format, rising at the former Unimart building, will be built to accommodate 150 global brands in addition to 2,000 new tiangge stalls. The new mall will play host to six new cinemas (4 prestige + 2 regular) in addition to eight digital cinemas at Greenhills Promenade and Theater Mall and two new foodcourts (budget-friendly and upscale Food Hall). It will have 3 levels of basement parking with 1,300 slots.

Another annex will be built at the former Greenhills Lifestyle Center wing, which is expected to open on early 2023, originally in December 2022. The three-storey mall will host 120 tenants along with new attractions and lifestyle options that will connect to the rest of the mall area.

Visitors
Greenhills has been a destination for bargain hunters since the 1970s. In 2003, it was reported that around 90,000 people a day visited the shopping complex, who stayed a few hours to shop and eat. About 80 percent of these shoppers were from 15 to 39 years old, and over half belonged to the middle and higher class, particularly from socioeconomic class A, B, and C. More than half of the shoppers were women.

Tenants

Around 2,000 entrepreneurs have stalls and shops within the complex's tiangge or flea market in 2003. On the same year, it is reported that an estimate of 90 percent of all South Sea pearls in the country go through Greenhills with a dedicated Pearl Center within the complex. Most of the pearl traders during this period comes from Marawi, Lanao del Sur in Mindanao. Among the other goods sold within the complex are furniture and clothing.

Major retailers in the country, Bayo, Kamiseta, Bench, Ricky Reyes, Folded & Hung, Gift Gate, Odyssey, Alberto, Astro Vision, Plains & Prints and Celine started as small shops in Greenhills. In addition to this, major food players Jollibee, KFC, McDonald's, Mang Inasal and many other well known food franchise thrive in the area.

A majority of the tenants at the Greenhills Shopping Center are Filipino Muslims of Maranao ethnicity, mainly as refugees of the Moro conflict in Mindanao. The tenants are represented by trade association Greenhills Muslim Traders Association Inc. (GMTA).

Religious facilities

The complex houses Chapel of the Holy Family, a Catholic chapel, and Masjid Greenhills, a Muslim musallah or prayer room. Victory, an Born Again Christian church, also opened a branch at the fourth floor of Virra Mall.

Greenhills Masjid
Originally, the lack of a dedicated musalla (prayer room) left Muslim tenants no choice but to pray their Salah within their stalls. This was until 1992, when Ortigas and Company granted the GMTA's request for a place of worship within the shopping center, as they were provided a prayer space in between Virra Mall, the Chapel of the Holy Family, and the Unimart supermarket.

In 2004, Ortigas and Company opened the McKinley Building, a four-storey parking building on the west side of the shopping center. This was followed a year later by the opening of the Greenhills Masjid, a  fully air-conditioned musalla on one floor of the building. The floor also includes a washing area and a Halal-certified restaurant serving Maranao cuisine. The masjid is able to accommodate up to 2,000 worshippers at a time, while its prayer hall is able to accommodate 400 worshippers at a time. According to the GMTA, as of 2016, the Greenhills Masjid is the biggest and only air-conditioned Muslim prayer area enclosed in a shopping mall in the country.

At the year of opening, 500 out of the 2000 merchants of the shopping center were reportedly Filipino Muslims.

Construction controversy
The construction of the Greenhills Masjid initially drew controversy from residents and homeowner associations of the adjacent Greenhills subdivisions due to fears and allegations that the Masjid would "attract gangs and terrorists" and lower property values, with residents threatening to boycott the shopping center if the project continued.

Ortigas Land chief operation officer Rex Drilon refuted the claims, assuring residents that the Muslim traders are "honest to goodness merchants eking out an honest living". He also denied that land values would drop due to the presence of the Muslim traders or the Greenhills Masjid, stating that property values of lots in the Greenhills area did not drop despite the 1997 Asian financial crisis. Greenhills Shopping Center general manager Joey Santos also stated that they would never consider dropping the project as it did not violate any laws, while recognizing the Muslim traders as "contributors to the success of Greenhills".

Religious activists praised the project as an example of "religious intolerance", while the Chapel of the Holy Family briefly suspended mass services during the Masjid's construction to show solidarity with the Muslim community. One of the homeowner associations had also written San Juan mayor JV Ejercito a letter demanding him to stop the project. However, the mayor instead lauded the project, calling it a "noble" gesture, and was reportedly irked at the "apparent religious intolerance". The Masjid opened in 2005 without any opposition, with opposing residents accepting that "there was nothing that they could do about it".

Incidents 
March 2, 2020: Dozens inside Virra Mall were held hostage by a 40-year-old man named Archie Paray, a security guard who was fired from work. One person was shot, but was reported to be in a stable condition in hospital.
March 6, 2020: A 62-year-old man who visited Masjid Greenhills tested positive for COVID-19 and was confirmed to be the first local coronavirus case and fifth case in the country.

References

External links

Greenhills Shopping Center

Shopping districts and streets in Metro Manila
Buildings and structures in San Juan, Metro Manila
Mixed-use developments in Metro Manila